Montejo de Tiermes is a municipality located in the province of Soria, Castile and León, Spain. In 2010 the population of Montejo de Tiermes (municipality) was 198 inhabitants, 126 men and 72 women. Montejo de Tiermes (locality) had a population of 58 inhabitants on 1 January 2010, 41 men and 17 women.

Tiermes archaeological site

The Tiermes (Termes, Tarmes) archaeological site at Montejo de Tiermes stands out among the diversity of archaeological remains in the Iberian Peninsula. In the mid 1930s, Blas Taracena, the Spanish archaeologist, organised systematic digs at the site and called Tiermes "the Spanish Pompeii".

Natural and Cultural Heritage 

Montejo is nicknamed after one of the most important Celtiberian and later Roman sites in the province and one of the most significant and surprising in Roman Hispania. Just 10 minutes from this town you can visit the archaeological site of the city of Tiermes; and next to it the Romanesque porticoed chapel of Santa María tells us about the continuity of the human settlement in this place.

Red earth and crops that green up or wither away compose a variable mosaic of tones in the course of the annual seasons. A little further south, the sources of the river Pedro and the Montejo stream irrigate these lands; next to the village another stream, the Pozo Moreno stream, borders the locality. Little by little they will gradually collect and channel water towards the great Duero in the domains of the Ribera.

Between the lands of La Ribera and El Burgo in the south of the province, bordering the neighbouring Castile-La Mancha region, the municipality of Montejo de Tiermes has a good number of adjoining districts, some of them with important testimonies of the Natural and Cultural Heritage of the area.

But let us begin with Montejo, a village that distributed its stone houses in line, flanking what was once the main street along which ran the road that communicated this locality with the surrounding areas. If we go into this street we will find a beautiful church dedicated to Saints Cornelius and Cyprian with Renaissance access to the atrium and a Romanesque porticoed gallery with four arcades surrounding the entrance; two arches are open and the other two are blinded. Within the urban area there is a dovecote that recalls a part of the economic past when, as now, livestock and agriculture were the main activities of the "montejanos" or perhaps "termestinos" due to the proximity of the city of Termes. Here, next to the site is the Romanesque chapel of Santa María, also with porticoes, a magnificent example of this medieval typology in the province of Soria. A didactic monographic museum of the Celtiberian-Roman city documents with information and materials the way of life of the historical inhabitants.

In one of the villages annexed to Montejo, an important collection of cave art is preserved in shelters and cliffs. In these caves of Sotillos de Caracena, the post-Palaeolithic engravings show anthropomorphic motifs, ramiform, reticules, circles and other geometric shapes.

A little further east of Montejo, in Valderromán, a holm oak grove preserves large and majestic specimens of this Quercus. The largest is said to have a longevity of more than 800 years, a trunk perimeter of 5 metres and a large shadow of more than 300 m2.

In the hamlet of Pedro, the hermitage of the Virgen del Val, located in a lush landscape of water and trees, tells us about the medieval past of this town.

There are several Assets of Cultural Interest in the municipality:

 Romanesque Hermitage of Nuestra Señora de Tiermes: declared on 28 May 1982 in the category of monument.

 Church of San Juan Bautista: in Ligos, declared a monument on 28 September 1995.

 Ermita de la Virgen del Val: in Pedro, listed as a monument on 27 April 2000.

 Yacimiento arqueológico de Tiermes: declared on 1 October 1999 in the category of archaeological site.

History 
We can make reference to the fountain of Roman origin, which is at the entrance of Montejo de Tiermes towards Ayllón, the defensive watchtower located in one of the central streets and which is of Muslim origin and possibly linked to the time of the Reconquest.

We cannot say exactly what was the origin of Montejo de Tiermes, although we know from the remaining buildings and from the nearby archaeological site of Tiermes, that it was a place of Arevacos, Celtiberians, Romans (Roman fountain in Montejo and inscription of a legionary in Noviales), Visigoths (hermitage of El Val in Pedro), Arabs (watchtower in Montejo); Reconquered by the Christians, it was a stopping place for Rodrigo Díaz de Vivar (El Cid) on his way to exile.

Part of the present municipality was part of the Community of Villa y Tierra de Ayllón included in the sexmo of Valdeliceras (Montejo de Tiermes, Liceras, Ligos, Torresuso, Cuevas de Ayllón and Noviales).

Another part was part of the Comunidad de Villa y Tierra de Caracena: Carrascosa de Arriba, Hoz de Abajo, Hoz de Abajo, Hoz de Arriba, Pedro, Rebollosa de Pedro and Valderromán.

In the 1789 Census, ordered by the Count of Floridablanca, it was listed as a place in the Partido de Ayllón in the Intendencia de Segovia, with seigniorial jurisdiction and under the authority of the Alcalde Pedáneo, appointed by the Marquis of Villena. At that time it had 289 inhabitants.

After the provincial reform of 1833, it became part of the province of Soria.

At the fall of the Ancien Régime, the locality became a constitutional municipality, then known as Montejo, in the region of Castilla la Vieja, in the district of El Burgo de Osma , which in the 1842 census had 66 households and 270 inhabitants.

In the mid-19th century it was renamed Montejo de Liceras and the municipality grew to include Pedro, Rebollosa de Pedro, Sotillos de Caracena and Torresuso.

At the end of the 20th century the municipality grew to include Carrascosa de Arriba, Cuevas de Ayllón, Hoz de Abajo, Hoz de Arriba, Noviales and Valderromán.

Economy 
The economy is basically based on agriculture (wheat, barley, oats) and livestock (sheep).

Tourism, a growing sector in the whole province, has also created jobs in the municipality due, in part, to the proximity of the Celtiberian-Roman ruins of Tiermes and the adjoining museum.

Of special relevance are the Astronomy Days (AstroTiermes), which each year bring together around three hundred amateurs and professionals in the vicinity of the Celtiberian and Roman site of Tiermes, in a type of tourism known as astro-tourism which seeks the quality of the night skies.

References

Municipalities in the Province of Soria